Sweet Somewhere Bound is the third studio album released by Jackie Greene.

Track listing
"About Cell Block #9" – 3:44
"Honey I Been Thinking About You" – 4:45
"Sweet Somewhere Bound" – 4:59
"Miss Madeline (3 Ways to Love Her)" – 5:39
"A Thing Called Rain" – 4:35
"Write a Letter Home" – 4:47
"I Don't Care About My Baby" – 4:05
"Alice on the Rooftop" – 4:51
"Seven Jealous Sisters" – 4:11
"Emily's in Heaven" – 5:24
"Sad to Say Goodbye" – 4:55
"Everything to Me" – 6:03
"Don't Mind Me, I'm Only Dying Slow" – 7:56

References

Jackie Greene albums
2004 albums